|}

The Lancashire Oaks is a Group 2 flat horse race in Great Britain open to fillies and mares aged three years or older. It is run at Haydock Park over a distance of 1 mile, 3 furlongs and 175 yards (2,373 metres), and it is scheduled to take place each year in early July.

History
The earliest recorded version of the race was run at Liverpool in the nineteenth century and was won in 1857 by The Derby winner Blink Bonny. The event was re-established in 1939, and it was run at Manchester Racecourse over 1 mile and 3 furlongs. It was abandoned throughout World War II, with no running from 1940 to 1946. In the early part of its history it was restricted to three-year-old fillies.

The original venue of the Lancashire Oaks closed in November 1963, and the race resumed at Haydock Park in 1965. The present system of race grading was introduced in 1971, and the event was subsequently given Group 3 status.

The Lancashire Oaks was opened to older fillies and mares in 1991. It was promoted to Group 2 level in 2004.

Records
Most successful horse (2 wins):
 Barshiba – 2009, 2010

Leading jockey (6 wins):
 Doug Smith – Smoke Screen (1947), Noble Lassie (1959), Chota Hazri (1960), Irristable (1961), French Cream (1962), Royal Flirt (1966)

Leading trainer (9 wins):
 John Gosden - Squeak (1997), Place Rouge (2003), Playful Act (2005), Gertrude Bell (2011), Great Heavens (2012), Pomology (2014), The Black Princess (2017), Enbihaar (2019), Free Wind (2022)

Winners since 1978

 The 2007 running took place at Newmarket over 1 mile and 4 furlongs.

Earlier winners

 1857: Blink Bonny
 1939: Cestria
 1940–46: no race
 1947: Smoke Screen
 1948: Young Entry
 1949: Eyewash
 1950: Dutch Clover
 1951: Dollarina
 1952: Stream of Light
 1953: Harvest Festival
 1954: Blue Prelude
 1955: Jenny Lind
 1956: Hustle
 1957: Lobelia
 1958: St Lucia
 1959: Noble Lassie
 1960: Chota Hazri
 1961: Irristable
 1962: French Cream
 1963: Red Chorus
 1964: no race
 1965: Without Reproach
 1966: Royal Flirt
 1967: The Nun
 1968: Bringley
 1969: Gambola
 1970: Amphora
 1971: Maina
 1972: Star Ship
 1973: Istiea
 1974: Mil's Bomb
 1975: One Over Parr
 1976: Centrocon
 1977: Busaca

See also
 Horse racing in Great Britain
 List of British flat horse races

References
 Paris-Turf:
 Racing Post:

 galopp-sieger.de – Lancashire Oaks.
 horseracingintfed.com – International Federation of Horseracing Authorities – Lancashire Oaks (2018).
 pedigreequery.com – Lancashire Oaks – Haydock Park.
 

Flat races in Great Britain
Haydock Park Racecourse
Long-distance horse races for fillies and mares
Recurring sporting events established in 1939
1939 establishments in England